Daniela Alfaro (born 6 August 2002) is a Costa Rican swimmer. She competed in the women's 200 metre butterfly event at the 2018 FINA World Swimming Championships (25 m), in Hangzhou, China.

References

2002 births
Living people
Costa Rican female swimmers
Female butterfly swimmers
Place of birth missing (living people)
21st-century Costa Rican women